Constitution Day of Kazakhstan (Kazakh: Қазақстан Республикасының Конституция күні) is the main national holiday in the Republic of Kazakhstan. Constitution Day is celebrated annually August 30. It commemorates the adoption of the Kazakhstani Constitution in 1995. Constitution Day is one of the most important holidays in Kazakhstan.

Celebrations 
There are traditionally mass festivities, concerts, parades and fireworks on this day. The Supreme Court of Kazakhstan also conducts seminars in high schools around the country. In 2011, Kazakhstani pop stars such as Nagima Yeskaliyeva, Zhanna Orynbassarova, as well as songs from The Beatles, and Almaty Symphony Orchestra.

Holiday parade 
The celebrations in 2009 in honor of the 14th anniversary of the Constitution of Kazakhstan were marked the first time that there was a military procession of the armed forces in Astana, the presiding officers of which were Adilbek Zhaksybekov and Major General Nurlan Dzhulamanov in their positions as Minister of Defense and Vice Minister of Defense respectively. Musical accompaniment for the parade were provided musicians of the Central Military Band of the Ministry of Defense of Kazakhstan, led by Colonel Alexander Belyakov. The ceremonial crews of the Ground Forces, the Air Defense Forces and the Naval Forces, as well as units of the Ministry of Internal Affairs, the National Security Committee, the Ministry of Emergency Situations and the Republican Guard passed through Kazakh Eli Square. In 2010, a parade was held again for the 15th anniversary of the Constitution of Kazakhstan, during which females took part in the parade for the first time. At the time, Kazakhstan was the only country to hold military parade on its Constitution Day. This tradition was honored for three years, until 2012, when it was abandoned.

See also 
 Public holidays in Kazakhstan
 Kazakhstan Independence Day

References 

Kazakhstan
Recurring events established in 1995
1995 establishments in Kazakhstan
Public holidays in Kazakhstan